Mansfelder Land was a district (Kreis) in the middle of Saxony-Anhalt, Germany. Neighboring districts were (from north clockwise) Aschersleben-Staßfurt, Bernburg, Saalkreis, Merseburg-Querfurt, Sangerhausen and Quedlinburg. It was merged on July 1, 2007, with Sangerhausen into the new district Mansfeld-Südharz as part of a reform.

History 

The district was created in 1994 by merging the previous districts Hettstedt and Eisleben. These were the successors of the Mansfelder Gebirgskreis (mountain district of Mansfeld) and Mansfelder Seekreis (lake district of Mansfeld), which were renamed after World War II.

The city of Eisleben is famous, being the birthplace of Martin Luther.

Geography 
The district is located in the southern foothills of the Harz mountains.

Coat of arms

Towns and municipalities

External links 
  (German)

Regions of Saxony-Anhalt